In mathematics, an absolute presentation is one method of defining a group.

Recall that to define a group  by means of a presentation, one specifies a set  of generators so that every element of the group can be written as a product of some of these generators, and a set  of relations among those generators. In symbols:

Informally  is the group generated by the set  such that  for all . One way of being able to eliminate this tacit assumption is by specifying that certain words in  should not be equal to  That is we specify a set , called the set of irrelations, such that  for all

Formal definition

generators. We then say  has absolute presentation

provided that:
  has presentation 

A more algebraic, but equivalent, way of stating condition 2 is:

2a. If  is a non-trivial normal subgroup of  then 

Remark: The concept of an absolute presentation has been fruitful in fields such as algebraically closed groups and the Grigorchuk topology.
In the literature, in a context where absolute presentations are being discussed, a presentation (in the usual sense of the word) is sometimes referred to as a relative presentation, which is an instance of a retronym.

Example

The cyclic group of order 8 has the presentation

But, up to isomorphism there are three more groups that "satisfy" the relation  namely:

 and

However none of these satisfy the irrelation . So an absolute presentation for the cyclic group of order 8 is:

It is part of the definition of an absolute presentation that the irrelations are not satisfied in any proper homomorphic image of the group. Therefore:

Is not an absolute presentation for the cyclic group of order 8 because the irrelation  is satisfied in the cyclic group of order 4.

Background 

The notion of an absolute presentation arises from Bernhard Neumann's study of the isomorphism problem for algebraically closed groups.

However algebraically closed groups are neither finitely generated nor recursively presented and so it is impossible to compare their presentations. Neumann considered the following alternative strategy: 

Suppose we know that a group  with finite presentation  can be embedded in the algebraically closed group  then given another algebraically closed group , we can ask "Can  be embedded in ?"

It soon becomes apparent that a presentation for a group does not contain enough information to make this decision for while there may be a homomorphism , this homomorphism need not be an embedding. What is needed is a specification for  that "forces" any homomorphism preserving that specification to be an embedding. An absolute presentation does precisely this.

References

Combinatorial group theory